Drasteria nubicola is a moth of the family Erebidae. It is found in North America, where it has been recorded from Nevada, California, Oregon and southern Idaho. The habitat consists of dry, open areas with sand dunes and salt flats.

The length of the forewings is 15–17 mm. The forewings are medium grey, with an oblique band between the antemedial line and median line, as well as a whitish-grey spot between the reniform spot and postmedial line. The hindwings are pale yellow with black marks. Adults are on wing from July to early August.

References

Drasteria
Moths described in 1870
Moths of North America